

Moseley is a locality in the Australian state of South Australia located on the Eyre Peninsula about  north-west of the state capital of Adelaide and about  north-east of the municipal seat in Kimba.

Moseley’s boundaries were created on 6 May 1999 for the “local established name”.  On 26 April 2013, land within the Lake Gilles Conservation Park was removed from Moseley and added to the new locality of Lake Gilles to ensure that all of the conservation park was within the locality of the same name.

Land use within the locality is ’primary production’ with exception to land on its western boundary dedicated as the protected area, the Mootra Conservation Reserve, land in its centre used for the Kimba Aerodrome and land in its south-western corner which has been zoned for use for bulk handling.

The 2016 Australian census which was conducted in August 2016 reports that Moseley had 19 people living within its boundaries.

Moseley is located within the federal division of Grey, the state electoral district of Giles and the local government area of the District Council of Kimba.

References

Towns in South Australia
Eyre Peninsula